Hillerød Kommune is a municipality (Danish, kommune) in Region Hovedstaden ("Capital Region"). The municipality covers an area of 212.99 km² (82.24 sq. miles), and has a total population of 53,257 (1. January 2022).  The mayor of the municipality as of 1 January 2018 is Kirsten Jensen, a member of the Social Democratic political party.

Overview
The main town and the site of its municipal council is the town also named as Hillerød. The city of Hillerød also houses the administrative capital of Region Hovedstaden.

Neighboring municipalities are Fredensborg municipality to the east, Gribskov municipality to the north, Frederiksværk-Hundested municipality to the west, and Frederikssund and Allerød to the south.

On 1 January 2007, Hillerød municipality was merged with Skævinge municipality and Uvelse valgdistrikt of former Slangerup municipality as the result of Kommunalreformen ("The Municipality Reform" of 2007), forming the new Hillerød municipality.  At the same time, it became part of the capital of Region Hovedstaden, a new region that includes the Danish capital of Copenhagen, about 25 km to the southeast.

Arresø, the largest lake in Denmark, lies partly in the municipality.

Urban areas
The ten largest urban areas in the municipality are:

Politics

Municipal council
Hillerød's municipal council consists of 27 members, elected every four years.

Below are the municipal councils elected since the Municipal Reform of 2007.

Twin towns – sister cities

Hillerød is twinned with:
 Kladovo, Serbia

References 

 Municipal statistics: NetBorger Kommunefakta, delivered from KMD aka Kommunedata (Municipal data)
 Municipal mergers and neighbors: Eniro new municipalities map

External links

Hillerød Tourist Information
Photos

 
Municipalities in the Capital Region of Denmark
Municipalities of Denmark
Populated places established in 2007